Spencer Historic District is a national historic district located at Spencer, Rowan County, North Carolina.  The district encompasses 242 contributing buildings in the central business district and surrounding residential sections of Spencer.  It largely developed between about 1902 and 1937, and includes notable examples of Queen Anne style architecture. Notable buildings include Cooke's Drug Store (c. 1902), the Julian Building (c. 1902), Wachovia-First National Bank Building (1903), Arey Building (1908), First Baptist Church (1926), Presbyterian Church (1903). Central Methodist Church (1921), Spencer Library (1913), Spencer Town Hall (1937), the John Hatley House (1901), and the Morrison House (c. 1910).

It was listed on the National Register of Historic Places in 1984.

References

Historic districts on the National Register of Historic Places in North Carolina
Queen Anne architecture in North Carolina
Buildings and structures in Rowan County, North Carolina
National Register of Historic Places in Rowan County, North Carolina